The Zytek ZB408 engine is a 4.0-litre, normally-aspirated, DOHC, V8 racing engine, developed and produced by Zytek for sports car racing, since 2000.

Applications
Panoz LMP07

References

Engines by model
Gasoline engines by model
Zytek engines
V8 engines